Wildboarclough is a village in east Cheshire, England, in the civil parish of Macclesfield Forest and Wildboarclough within the Peak District National Park. Bilsborough states that the name arises from the rapid rise in levels of the Clough Brook after a heavy fall of rain, but Mills gives it as a deep valley (or clough) frequented by wild boar. According to old legend it was the place where the last wild boar in England was killed.

From the nearby summit of Shutlingsloe, which lies just to the north-west of the village, a wide panorama of the Cheshire Plain and the Peak District can be obtained. In clear conditions the view extends as far as the Mersey Estuary and the Welsh Clwydian Hills  to the west, and the cooling towers of the power stations on the banks of the River Trent  to the east. Nearby is the hamlet of Saltersford. The Peak District Boundary Walk runs through the village.

See also
Crag Hall
St Saviour's Church, Wildboarclough

References

Towns and villages of the Peak District